Tanjung Bidara is a beach in Alor Gajah District, Malacca, Malaysia.

See also
 List of cities and towns in Malaysia by population

External links 
 Tanjung Bidara Beach Resort

References 

Populated places in Malacca